Aryan languages may refer to:
 The Indo-Iranian languages 
Indo-Aryan languages, one of the two main branches of Indo-Iranian
Iranian languages, the other main branch of Indo-Iranian
 The Indo-European languages as a whole (obsolete usage)

See also
Aryan (disambiguation)